Joseph Richard Nolan (June 14, 1925 – April 23, 2013) was an American jurist.

Early life and education
He was born in the Mattapan neighborhood of Boston, Massachusetts. He was the younger of two sons whose father was a school custodian and whose mother cleaned houses. He graduated from Boston College High School in 1942. He would later graduate from Boston College with a Bachelor of Science degree in 1950 and from Boston College Law School with a Bachelor of Laws degree in 1954.

Military service
He served in the United States Navy during World War II reaching the rank of Pharmacist's Mate Third Class. He served in the Pacific Theater.

Legal & academic career
He started his legal career in private practice and later became an assistant district attorney for Suffolk County. He served as the general counsel for the Massachusetts Lottery Commission. From 1965 to 2011 he was a professor of law at Suffolk University Law School.

Judicial career
From 1973 to 1978 he was a special justice for the Brighton District of the Boston Municipal Court. From 1978 to 1980 he was a judge on the Massachusetts Superior Court. From 1980 to 1981 he was an associate justice on the Massachusetts Appeals Court. From 1981 to 1995 he was an associate justice on the Massachusetts Supreme Judicial Court. He retired from judicial service in 1995.

Later life
He served as President of the Catholic Lawyers Guild from 1995 until his death in 2013.

Personal life
He married Margaret M. “Peggy” Kelly in 1947. They had seven children. She died in 2014.

Death
He died on April 23, 2013, in St. Elizabeth‟s Medical Center in Brighton from complications of a broken hip he suffered a couple days prior.

Notes

1925 births
2013 deaths
Boston College alumni
Boston College Law School alumni
Massachusetts state court judges
Justices of the Massachusetts Supreme Judicial Court
20th-century American lawyers
20th-century American judges
People from Mattapan
Massachusetts lawyers
United States Navy personnel of World War II